Chet Samian station is a Class 3 railway station in Chet Samian Subdistrict, Photharam District, Ratchaburi,  from Thon Buri railway station.

References 

Railway stations in Thailand